USS Culgoa (AF-3) was a refrigerated supply ship in the United States Navy.

Culgoa was built in 1889 by J.L. Thompson and Sons, Ltd. of Sunderland, England and purchased at Cavite, Philippines on 4 June 1898. During the naval blockade of Manila, the vessel supplied the American squadron with ice and meat. Since she was not a commissioned naval vessel, Culgoa could purchase supplies while avoiding the neutrality laws that banned sales to the Navy.

Service history

Philippine–American War, 1898–1901
On 3 December 1898, one week before the Treaty of Paris that ended the Spanish–American War was signed, Culgoa was commissioned.

Assigned to the Asiatic Squadron as a refrigerator supply ship, Culgoa sailed out of Cavite Navy Yard supplying ships and troops at Manila with ice and meat until August 1899. Overhauled at Hong Kong between 20 October and 18 November 1899, Culgoa returned to supply duties, making three voyages to Sydney and Brisbane, Queensland, Australia, for fresh stores in 1900 and 1901.

On 22 July 1901 she cleared Cavite and sailed by way of Ceylon, Suez, Malta, and Gibraltar to New York City, arriving 25 September. She was placed out of commission on 16 October 1901 at Boston, Massachusetts.

North Atlantic Squadron, 1902–1907
Recommissioned 1 October 1902 Culgoa joined the North Atlantic Squadron and provided storeship services to ships and shore stations in the Caribbean and Gulf of Mexico until again placed out of commission 11 August 1905. Considered for disposition, she was stricken from the Naval Vessel Register on 7 May 1906, but reinstated on 30 June 1906 and recommissioned 12 September 1907 for service with the Atlantic Fleet.

Great White Fleet, 1907–1909
Sailing from New York on 21 September 1907 Culgoa was loaned to the Panama Railway Company for an emergency shipment of beef, returning to New York 16 October 1907.  On 11 December Culgoa left to join the Atlantic Battleship Fleet at Santa Lucia as mobile stores ship, one of four auxiliaries accompanying the sixteen battleships on the cruise of the "Great White Fleet". During the cruise, while on a planned supply run, she carried naval artist Henry Reuterdahl, who painted a number of scenes of the expedition.

At Amoy, China, and in the Formosa Strait between 28 October and 5 November 1908, she assisted in the establishment of wireless communications with the Second Squadron.

On 3 January 1909, while at Port Said she broke off from fleet duties to bring emergency supplies to Messina, Italy, which had been ravaged by an earthquake.

Atlantic, Caribbean, 1909–1919
Returning to Hampton Roads 17 February 1909, Culgoa resumed her cruise along the Atlantic coast and in the Caribbean until 1 December 1910, when she sailed to supply ships serving in European waters, visiting Brest and Cherbourg, France, and Weymouth, Dorset and Gravesend, Kent, England, before returning to New York on 20 January 1911.

She put out from New York 11 February 1911 for duty in the Caribbean, where she supplied stores for ships and shore detachments protecting American citizens and interests throughout this troubled area until February 1918.

Serving with the Naval Overseas Transportation Service during the remainder of World War I, Culgoa made seven transatlantic convoy voyages to bases in France and Britain between 19 February 1918 and 10 May 1919. Culgoa took aboard the passenger survivors and towed San Jacinto into Halifax, Nova Scotia.

Pacific, 1920–1922
Culgoa issued stores and provisions to Battle Squadron 2 at Guantanamo Bay from 24 March to 6 April 1920, then after supplying shore installations at Yorktown, Virginia, and Philadelphia, cleared Brooklyn on 2 June for fleet maneuvers in the Pacific. Given hull classification symbol AF-3 on 17 July 1920, she joined Battle Squadron 2 at Colón, Panama, transited the Panama Canal, and joined in fleet problems on her way to Pearl Harbor, visiting Seattle, Washington, and San Francisco.

Returning to New York 3 September 1920 for overhaul, she resumed her supply operations on the east coast and in the Caribbean between February and October 1921. Culgoa was decommissioned at New York City on 31 December 1921 and sold 25 July 1922.

As of 2005, no other US ship has been named Culgoa.

See also

Sources

Other sources that document USS Culgoa's service during World War I include Jay C. Martin, Convoys, Consumables, and Camaraderie: The World War I Journal of Earle M. Powers, United States Navy (Ithaca: University Museum Press, 2015).  ; .  Powers' journal includes photographs, daily entries, and illustrations that document his time aboard the USS Culgoa, 1917–1918.

Bibliography

External links
  NavSource Online: Service Ship Photo Archive USS Culgoa (AF-3)
 Naval Historical Center USS Culgoa (1898–1922, later AF-3)

Ships built on the River Wear
1889 ships
Stores ships of the United States Navy
World War I auxiliary ships of the United States